In differential geometry, in the category of differentiable manifolds, a fibered manifold is a surjective submersion

that is, a surjective differentiable mapping such that at each point  the tangent mapping

is surjective, or, equivalently, its rank equals

History

In topology, the words fiber (Faser in German) and fiber space (gefaserter Raum) appeared for the first time in a paper by Herbert Seifert in 1932, but his definitions are limited to a very special case. The main difference from the present day conception of a fiber space, however, was that for Seifert what is now called the base space (topological space) of a fiber (topological) space  was not part of the structure, but derived from it as a quotient space of  The first definition of fiber space is given by Hassler Whitney in 1935 under the name sphere space, but in 1940 Whitney changed the name to sphere bundle.

The theory of fibered spaces, of which vector bundles, principal bundles, topological fibrations and fibered manifolds are a special case, is attributed to Seifert, Hopf, Feldbau, Whitney, Steenrod, Ehresmann, Serre, and others.

Formal definition

Examples

 Every differentiable fiber bundle is a fibered manifold.
 Every differentiable covering space is a fibered manifold with discrete fiber.
 In general, a fibered manifold needs not to be a fiber bundle: different fibers may have different topologies. An example of this phenomenon may be constructed by taking the trivial bundle  and deleting two points in two different fibers over the base manifold  The result is a new fibered manifold where all the fibers except two are connected.

Properties

 Any surjective submersion  is open: for each open  the set  is open in 

Fibered coordinates

Let  (resp. ) be an -dimensional (resp. -dimensional) manifold. A fibered manifold  admits fiber charts.

where

The above fiber chart condition may be equivalently expressed by

where

is the projection onto the first  coordinates. The chart  is then obviously unique.

Conversely, if a surjection  admits a fibered atlas, then  is a fibered manifold.

Local trivialization and fiber bundles

Let  be a fibered manifold and  any manifold. Then an open covering  of  together with maps

called trivialization maps, such that

is a local trivialization with respect to 

A fibered manifold together with a manifold  is a fiber bundle with typical fiber (or just fiber)  if it admits a local trivialization with respect to  The atlas  is then called a bundle atlas.

See also

Notes

References

Historical

External links

 

Differential geometry
Fiber bundles
Manifolds